Bernard Ntaganda (born 1967) is the founder and president of the Social Party Imberakuri, the 10th political formation recognized in Rwanda, formed in December 2008. Ntaganda was born in Ruhango District, Gitarama Prefecture.

On June 24, 2010, Mr. Bernard Ntaganda was arrested and sentenced to 4 years due to what the government ruled were illegal demonstrations. He was released in June 2014 after serving a four-year term.

References

Living people
Prisoners and detainees of Rwanda
Rwandan politicians
Social Party Imberakuri politicians
1967 births